James Gordon (December 27, 1908 – May 26, 1997) was an American sprinter. He competed in the men's 400 metres at the 1932 Summer Olympics.

References

1908 births
1997 deaths
Athletes (track and field) at the 1932 Summer Olympics
American male sprinters
Olympic track and field athletes of the United States
People from Barberton, Ohio